

List of Ambassadors
Liat Wexelman (Non-Resident, Astana) 2018 - 
Michael Brodsky (Non-Resident, Astana) 2015 - 2018
Eliyaho Tasman (Non-Resident, Astana) 2012 - 2015
Israel Mey Ami (Non-Resident, Astana) 2008 - 2012
Ran Ichay (Non-Resident, Almaty & Astana) 2006 - 2008
Michael Lotem (Non-Resident, Almaty) 2004 - 2006
Moshe Kimhi (Non-Resident, Almaty) 2002 - 2004
Israel Mey Ami (Non-Resident, Almaty) 1996 - 2002
Ambassador Bentsion Karmel (Non-Resident, Almaty) 1993 - 1996
Chargé d'Affaires a.i. Arkady Milman (Non-Resident, Almaty) 1992 - 1993

References

Kyrgyzstan
Israel